Juan Antonio Corbalán Alfocea (born August 3, 1954) is a Spanish retired professional basketball player. The 6 ft.  in. (1.84 m) tall. Corbalán was one of the best European point guards of the 1980s. He represented his native country in three Summer Olympic Games (1972, 1980, and 1984).

He was named one of FIBA's 50 Greatest Players in 1991. In 2008, he was named one of the 50 Greatest EuroLeague Contributors.

Club career

Real Madrid
Corbalán spent most of his club career playing in the top-level Spanish League. He played with Real Madrid, from 1971–72, until 1987–88. With Real Madrid, he won 12 Spanish League championships, winning 9 of them in the LEB Primera División (1972, 1973, 1974, 1975, 1976, 1977, 1979, 1980, and 1982), and 3 of them in the Liga ACB (1984, 1985, 1986).

He also won 7 Spanish Cups, 3 FIBA European Champions Cups (EuroLeague), one FIBA European Cup Winners' Cup (FIBA Saporta Cup), one FIBA Korać Cup, and 4 FIBA Intercontinental Cups.

National team career
Corbalán was named the Most Valuable Player of the EuroBasket 1983, after leading Spain to the final against Italy, which was eventually lost, though. He also won the silver medal with the senior Spanish national team at the 1984 Los Angeles Summer Olympic Games.

References

External links 
Euroleague.net profile
FIBA Europe Profile
LeyendasNaloncestoRealMadrid.es 
Spanish Olympic Committee 

1954 births
Living people
Basketball players at the 1972 Summer Olympics
Basketball players at the 1980 Summer Olympics
Basketball players at the 1984 Summer Olympics
CB Valladolid players
Liga ACB players
Medalists at the 1984 Summer Olympics
Olympic basketball players of Spain
Olympic medalists in basketball
Olympic silver medalists for Spain
Point guards
Real Madrid Baloncesto players
Spanish men's basketball players
1974 FIBA World Championship players
1982 FIBA World Championship players
Basketball players from Madrid